Valadi is a zone in Trichy city located on 5 miles from Chathram Bus Terminus in Trichy, Tamil Nadu along the Trichy-Chennai railway. Its size and importance today is much lesser than its status in the pre-independence era, due to massive emigration over the last few decades in search for better career, and its diaspora numbering a few thousands is spread all across the world.

Economy

Valadi is a primarily agricultural economy and is located in the fertile rice belt of Trichy-Thanjavur region. The presence of the river Kaveri in the region and its supporting canals like Kollidam made three crops a year possible and hence the region became prosperous. One of the first major dams in history, Kallanai built by the Chola king Karikala cholan around 2000 years ago is located few miles from this place. Many of inhabitants also find work in the nearby places of Lalgudi, and with the economic boom in India, there has been a growth in the service industry too. A number of expensive houses have started to come in this region both out of the economic growth and
the investment from the diaspora is yet to come due to the long distance from the major financial centers like Chennai and Bangalore.

Places of worship

The old Shiva temple, Vishwanathasamy temple, and the native goddess abode of Shri Ulaganayaki temple are the main places of worship in Valadi. The Lakshminarayana swamy temple is the key highlight to Keezha Valadi. There is also the Keezha Sivan Kovil that was visited and worshipped by Mahaperiyaval Sri Chandrasekarendra Saraswathi Swamigal. The famous Vishnu temple of Ranganathaswamy temple, Ganesh temple at Rockfort and the Shiva temple at Thiruvanaikaval are all located in a 5-mile radius from Valadi. Also the famous Lord Sri Muthumariyamman Temple is located in Kavalkara Street & Also one of the oldest Temple of Elamanadichi Amman Temple with big water tank is located at Thathanoor kallar street Valadi.

Also the famous Lord Goddess Prithyunga Devi temple is located in Sempalani Street.

Valadi is known for its tradition building and temples. Even the bus stop of Valadi is Known as Shivan kovil stop. Shiva temple is well known temple which is near the road and yearly we do have some festivals.

Cultural Wealth

Valadi is a place of great cultural heritage; It was the home of many great musicians and scholars.  Valadi Krishnaiyer, Lalgudi Jayaraman, V. Seshasayee are some of the natives of Valadi.

Transport
Valadi is a few miles from Trichy airport that services national and international flights. It has frequent flights to Chennai and the flight time is around 30 mins. From the airport, a taxi cab should cost around Rs.250 ($5).

By Train, the closest station is Lalgudi that services a lot of regional trains and almost all major trains operating in the region (Rockfort Express, Guruvayur Express, Rameswaram Express, Pallavan Express, Mangalore express) stop at Srirangam and from there you could get a local bus or an autorickshaw. Typical journey time from the station is less than 30 mins. From Chennai, the total time is approximately 7 hours.

By Bus, you can reach Trichy Central bus stand (or) Junction from any place in Tamil Nadu, and from there you could take a city bus towards Lalgudi. Alternatively, you could go to Chathram Bus Stand and it has frequent bus services to Valadi. For people coming from north of Trichy, the buses generally stop in tollgate, and you could take an autorickshaw for around Rs.50.

Now it has the long bridge over the railway track, which makes the people easy to travel without waiting for the train. Now we also could see lot of call taxi , autorickshaws, mini tempo which are accessible anytime.

Bank, Post Office, school and railway station
This is one of the very few villages which has post office and Bank. It also has the automated teller machine outside the bank. People can use this ATM during the bank official hours.

Post office is also used by the other nearby villages, which is big help for the neighboring villages.

There is a Government Higher secondary school and railway station where the local passenger trains stop.

References

External links

Neighbourhoods and suburbs of Tiruchirappalli